Charles Lee (born November 11, 1984) is an American former professional basketball player and associate head coach for the Milwaukee Bucks of the National Basketball Association (NBA). A 6'3" guard from Bucknell University, he spent most of his professional career in Israel and Europe. Lee is married to his college sweetheart Lindsey. She also played basketball at Bucknell.

The 2006 Patriot League Player of the Year, Lee helped guide Bucknell to two straight Patriot League Championships and two straight NCAA tournament second-round appearances. In four seasons with the Bison, he earned First Team All-Patriot League honors twice (2004, 2005) and Second Team All-Patriot League honors once (2003). He finished his career at Bucknell with 1,147 career points (11.0 ppg), 568 rebounds (5.5 rpg) and 167 steals (1.61 spg).

Lee enrolled at Bucknell a year before the school started offering athletic scholarships, and never received anything more than partial financial aid. The New York Times called him "[one of] college basketball's best nonscholarship players". At Bucknell, Lee majored in business.

After graduating in 2006, Lee played with the San Antonio Spurs during the NBA's summer league and pre-season, but he did not make the regular season roster. He has since played for Hapoel Gilboa/Afula in Israel, Verviers-Pepinster in Belgium and MEG Goettingen and Artland Dragons in Germany.

On June 25, 2012, Bucknell announced that Lee was returning to his alma mater as an assistant men's basketball coach.

References

https://germanhoops.com/2019/05/09/the-miles-where-are-they-now-player-profile-with-charles-lee/

External links
Bucknell profile

1984 births
Living people
American expatriate basketball people in Belgium
American expatriate basketball people in Germany
American expatriate basketball people in Israel
American men's basketball players
Artland Dragons players
Atlanta Hawks assistant coaches
Basketball coaches from Washington, D.C.
Basketball players from Washington, D.C.
BG Göttingen players
Bucknell Bison men's basketball coaches
Bucknell Bison men's basketball players
Hapoel Gilboa/Afula players
Israeli Basketball Premier League players
Milwaukee Bucks assistant coaches
RBC Pepinster players
Shooting guards